The 1965 Cornell Big Red football team was an American football team that represented Cornell University during the 1965 NCAA University Division football season. Cornell finished fourth in the Ivy League . 

In its fifth and final season under head coach Tom Harp, the team compiled a 4–3–2 record and outscored opponents 192 to 137. Phil Ratner was the team captain. 

Cornell's 3–3–1 conference record placed fourth in the Ivy League standings. The Big Red outscored Ivy opponents 143 to 124. 

Cornell played its home games at Schoellkopf Field in Ithaca, New York.

Schedule

References

Cornell
Cornell Big Red football seasons
Cornell Big Red football